Histogenesis is the formation of different tissues from undifferentiated cells. These cells are constituents of three primary germ layers, the endoderm, mesoderm, and ectoderm. The science of the microscopic structures of the tissues formed within histogenesis is termed histology.

Germ layers

A germ layer is a collection of cells, formed during animal and mammalian embryogenesis. Germ layers are typically pronounced within vertebrate organisms; however, animals or mammals more complex than sponges (eumetazoans and agnotozoans) produce two or three primary tissue layers. Animals with radial symmetry, such as cnidarians, produce two layers, called the ectoderm and endoderm. They are diploblastic. Animals with bilateral symmetry produce a third layer in-between called mesoderm, making them triploblastic. Germ layers will eventually give rise to all of an animal's or mammal's tissues and organs through a process called organogenesis.

Endoderm

The endoderm is one of the germ layers formed during animal embryogenesis. Cells migrating inward along the archenteron form the inner layer of the gastrula, which develops into the endoderm. Initially, the endoderm consists of flattened cells, which subsequently become columnar.

Mesoderm

The mesoderm germ layer forms in the embryos of animals and mammals more complex than cnidarians, making them triploblastic. During gastrulation, some of the cells migrating inward to form the endoderm form an additional layer between the endoderm and the ectoderm. A theory suggests that this key innovation evolved hundreds of millions of years ago and led to the evolution of nearly all large, complex animals. The formation of a mesoderm led to the formation of a coelom. Organs formed inside a coelom can freely move, grow, and develop independently of the body wall while fluid cushions and protects them from shocks.

Ectoderm

The ectoderm is the start of a tissue that covers the body surfaces. It emerges first and forms from the outermost of the germ layers.

Production

The proceeding graph represents the products produced by the three germ layers.

See also 

 Histology
List of human cell types derived from the germ layers

References

Further reading
 Microsoft Corporation. Histogenesis  (Archived 2009-10-31). Encarta World English Dictionary (North American Edition). URL accessed on 14 May 2005.
 Evers, Christine A., Lisa Starr. Biology:Concepts and Applications. 6th ed. United States:Thomson, 2006. .

External links

  Derivatives of the Ectoderm
  Derivatives of the Endoderm and Mesoderm

Developmental biology
Embryology
Histology